Aemene taeniata is a moth of the family Erebidae first described by Johann Heinrich Fixsen in 1887. It is found in the Russian Far East (Middle Amur, Primorye) and Korea.

References

Cisthenina
Moths described in 1887
Moths of Asia